Combretum leprosum, the mofumbo in Portuguese and the asucaró in eastern Bolivian Spanish, is a plant species in the genus Combretum found throughout the Amazon Basin.

This plant contains combretastatin A-4. 

In many areas of the eastern Bolivian countryside, people have traditionally maintained specimens of these trees and encouraged their proliferation because they are perceived to be useful providers of shade.

References

External links

leprosum
Flora of Brazil
Plants described in 1841